SS Montanan was a cargo ship built in 1912 for the American-Hawaiian Steamship Company. During World War I service for the United States Army Transport Service, she was known as USAT Montanan. Montanan was built by the Maryland Steel Company as one of eight sister ships for the American-Hawaiian Steamship Company, and was employed in inter-coastal service via the Isthmus of Tehuantepec and the Panama Canal after it opened.

In World War I, USAT Montanan carried cargo and animals to France, and was in the first American convoy to sail to France after the United States entered the war in April 1917.

Design and construction
The contract cost of the ships was set at the construction cost plus an 8% profit for Maryland Steel, but with a maximum cost of $640,000 per ship. The construction was financed by Maryland Steel with a credit plan that called for a 5% down payment in cash, with nine monthly installments for the balance. The deal had provisions that allowed some of the nine installments to be converted into longer-term notes or mortgages. The final cost of Montanan, including financing costs, was $73.62 per deadweight ton, which came out to just over $692,000.

Montanan (Maryland Steel yard no. 126) was the second ship built under the original contract. She was launched on 25 January 1913, and delivered to American-Hawaiian in April.

Early career
When Montanan began sailing for American-Hawaiian, the company shipped cargo from East Coast ports via the Tehuantepec Route to West Coast ports and Hawaii, and vice versa. Shipments on the Tehuantepec Route arrived at Mexican ports—Salina Cruz, Oaxaca, for eastbound cargo, and Coatzacoalcos, Veracruz, for westbound cargo—and traversed the Isthmus of Tehuantepec on the Tehuantepec National Railway. Eastbound shipments were primarily sugar and pineapple from Hawaii, while westbound cargoes were more general in nature. Montanan sailed in this service on the east side of North America.

While headed from New York to Coatzacoalcos in October 1913, Montanan ran aground on Mantanilla Reef, north of The Bahamas. Answering Montanans distress calls, the Standard Oil Company tanker Rayo assisted in freeing Montanan from the reef. Although she was leaking slightly, Montanan continued on to her destination, and put in for repairs after a return trip to New York.

Following the United States occupation of Veracruz on 21 April 1914 (which took place while six American-Hawaiian ships were being held in various Mexican ports), the Huerta-led Mexican government closed the Tehuantepec National Railway to American shipping. This loss of access, coupled with the fact that the Panama Canal was not yet open, caused American-Hawaii to return to its historic route of sailing around South America via the Straits of Magellan in late April. With the opening of the Panama Canal on 15 August, American-Hawaiian ships switched to the canal route.

On 2 December, The Washington Post reported an incident involving Montanan. While headed down the Pacific coast of Mexico with a cargo of dried fruits and canned goods, Montanan was approached by a Japanese warship, which fired a warning shot for Montanan to stop. After doing so, a boarding party with Japanese officers in a launch headed to Montanan. When the American identity of Montanan was established to the satisfaction of the Japanese, they returned to their ship without boarding Montanan. The news report did not identify the type or the name of the Japanese warship, which had been searching for a German vessel thought to be operating in the area.

On Montanans next trip, the ship collided with a wharf in Los Angeles Harbor. Montanan had arrived in Los Angeles from Puget Sound on 22 January 1915 to complete her load before sailing for New York and Boston. The almost fully loaded ship was slow to respond to the helm and ended up "ploughing through"  of Municipal Pier A on Mormon Island channel before coming to a stop at a stone bulkhead. One hull plate on Montanan was dented, but the ship was otherwise undamaged. Montanans captain, who had a local license, did not take on a harbor pilot and American-Hawaiian was liable for the damage, estimated by the harbor engineer to be $2,500.

Contemporary news reports offer hints at cargoes that Montanan carried during this period. In April 1915, the Los Angeles Times reported on the sailing of Montanan with a full cargo. The majority of the cargo was rice—from Japan, China, and California—which was destined for the United Kingdom to feed Indian troops fighting in Europe.

In October 1915, landslides closed the Panama Canal and all American-Hawaiian ships, including Montanan, returned to the Straits of Magellan route again. Montanans exact movements from this time through early 1917 are unclear. She may have been in the half of the American-Hawaiian fleet that was chartered for transatlantic service, or she may have been in the group of American-Hawaiian ships chartered for service to South America, delivering coal, gasoline, and steel in exchange for coffee, nitrates, cocoa, rubber, and manganese ore.

U.S. Army service
After the United States declared war on Germany in April 1917, the United States Army—needing transports to get its men and materiel to France—had a select committee of shipping executives pore over registries of American shipping. The committee selected Montanan, her sister ship Dakotan, and 12 other American-flagged ships that were sufficiently fast, could carry enough fuel in their bunkers for transatlantic crossings, and, most importantly, were in port or not far at sea. After Montanan discharged her last load of cargo, she was officially handed over to the Army on 29 May.

Before troop transportation began, all of the ships were hastily refitted. Of the fourteen ships, four, including Montanan and Dakotan, were designated to carry animals and other cargo; the other ten were designated to carry troops. Ramps and stalls were built on the four ships chosen to carry livestock. Gun platforms were installed on each ship before docking at the Brooklyn Navy Yard, where the guns were put in place. All the ships were manned by merchant officers and crews but carried two U.S. Navy officers, Navy gun crews, quartermasters, signalmen, and wireless operators. The senior Navy officer on board would take control if a ship came under attack.

Montanan departed with her group on the morning of 17 June for Brest, France, steaming at an  pace. A thwarted submarine attack on the first convoy group, and reports of heavy submarine activity off of Brest, resulted in a change in the convoy's destination to Saint-Nazaire where the convoy arrived 2 July.

Montanan departed Saint-Nazaire on 14 July in the company of her convoy mates El Occidente, Dakotan, and Edward Luckenbach. Joining the return trip were Army transport , Navy armed collier , Navy oiler , and cruiser , the flagship of Rear Admiral Albert Gleaves, the head of the Navy's Cruiser and Transport Force.

At sundown, shortly before 18:00, German submarine  launched three torpedoes at Montanan. The first two, spotted by lookouts aboard Montanan, missed, but a third, unseen torpedo struck Montanan amidships on her port side, opening a large hole. Montanan began to settle and was abandoned quickly. Two of Montanans Naval Armed Guardsmen drowned when their lifeboat capsized in the heavy seas; three of her civilian crewmen also died in the attack. Montanans 81 survivors were rescued by convoy escort Noma.
 
Montanans captain and several officers reboarded the ship the next morning for an attempt to get her under tow, but despite their efforts, the ship sank later that morning.

Notes

References

Bibliography

External links

Ships built in Sparrows Point, Maryland
Cargo ships of the United States
World War I merchant ships of the United States
World War I auxiliary ships of the United States
Transport ships of the United States Army
Ships sunk by German submarines in World War I
World War I shipwrecks in the Atlantic Ocean
1913 ships
Maritime incidents in 1918